Saraswat Co-operative Bank Ltd. is an urban co-operative banking institution, having its headquarter in Mumbai, Maharashtra, India and operating as a co-operative society since 1918. The Founding Members of the society were J. K. Parulkar as chairman, N. B. Thakur as vice-chairman, P. N. Warde as Secretary, and Shivram Gopal Rajadhyaksha as Treasurer.

In 1988, the bank was conferred with the Scheduled status by the Reserve Bank of India. It is the first co-operative bank to provide merchant banking services. The bank got a permanent license to deal in foreign exchange in 1979. Presently, the bank has a correspondent relationship in 58 countries covering nine currencies with over 162 banks.

In the last two decades, the bank has witnessed a steady growth in business and also taken several strategic business initiatives such as undertaking business process reengineering initiative, merging seven cooperative banks and then consciously nurturing them. The bank tied up with VISA International for issuance of debit cards. The bank launched RuPay EMV Debit Card in 2013–14. The bank was the first to achieve this milestone in respect of RuPay EMV card along with the Bank of Baroda.

In 2011, the bank was granted permission for All India Area of Operation by the Reserve Bank of India. 

The bank has a network of 284 fully computerized branches and 311 ATMs (Automated teller machine) as on 31 March 2020 covering six states viz. Maharashtra, Gujarat, Madhya Pradesh, Karnataka, Goa and Delhi. 

It was ranked second-best bank in India by The World's Best Banks 2020 survey conducted by the Forbes, an American business magazine.

References

Banks based in Mumbai
Banks established in 1918
Cooperative banks of India
Indian companies established in 1918